Jumadi is an androgynous deity worshipped in the Buta Kola folk tradition. The Buta Kola cult is popular among the Tuluva ethnic people in the coastal districts of Karnataka, India.

Mythology

Jumadi is considered a deity of heavenly origin who descends to the Tulunadu region to receive worship from the people. 

The various myths prevalent in the region describe the deity's insatiable thirst and the establishment of its cult among the dominant Bunt community. The deity's cult is further exalted by the worship it receives from the Chowta royal family of Moodabidri. The Royal House of Chowta worships Jumadi at a shrine inside the Chowtara Aramane Palace. 

The deity's association with the ruling class Bunts gives it the epithet "Rajan-Daiva" (Deity of the Rulers). The myths pertaining to Jumadi are oral in nature and are recorded in distinctive Tulu folk songs called paddanas.

The paddanas record the various adventures and legends of the deity. They also record the various forms and names of the deity such as Kanteri Jumadi  (Jumadi worshipped by the Bunt Feudal Lords, Kantanna Adhikari and Devu Poonja), Marlu Jumadi (the wild form of the princely Jumadi), and Sarala Jumadi (Jumadi worshipped by a thousand households).

See also
Nagaradhane

References

Culture of Tulu Nadu
Indian deities
Androgynous and hermaphroditic deities